Euseius lecodactylus is a species of mite in the family Phytoseiidae.

References

lecodactylus
Articles created by Qbugbot
Animals described in 1996